Andrej Pavicevic (born 26 May 1975 in Sydney, Australia) is an Australian race driver. He started racing in the NSW Street Sedan Championship in 1994 in a Suzuki Swift GTi. From there he moved to the Australian Production Car Championship in 1995 have major success winning 3 class championships in 1995, 1996 and 1997 and he raced a Ford Mondeo in the 1997 Bathurst 1000 race. In 1998 his major sponsor Zepter entered him in the British Formula 3 Championship even though he had next to no open wheel Formula racing experience. As expected he had a tough year in 1998, starting 14 races and scored 19 points finishing 14th for the year and also entered the 1998 Masters of Formula 3 event at Zandvoort. He then graduated to the FIA International Formula 3000 Championship in 1999 where he completed the whole season, qualifying for only 4 events. In 2000 he was picked up by Durango for the Italian Formula 3000 Championship. He had a pole position in the season opener, but failed to score any points. The best finish he had was at the Non Championship race at Assen. After 3 years in Europe he returned to Australia. On his return he started Drag Racing with some success. He was diagnosed with leukaemia, and after a long battle, beat the disease. He now lives in Sydney, preparing and racing Drag Cars from his Croydon Racing Developments workshop.

Career results

Complete International Formula 3000 results
(key) (Races in bold indicate pole position; races in italics indicate fastest lap.)

Complete Italian Formula 3000 results

(key) (Races in bold indicate pole position; races in italics indicate fastest lap)

See also
List of International Formula 3000 drivers

References

External links
   Speedsport Profile
 Driver Database profile
 Business webpage

1975 births
British Formula Three Championship drivers
Auto GP drivers
International Formula 3000 drivers
Living people
Racing drivers from Sydney
Australian people of Serbian descent
Durango drivers
Fortec Motorsport drivers